Bill and Ben is a British programme for young children that aired between 11 January 2001 and 4 September 2002 for two seasons. The TV series is a remake of the 1952 TV series Flower Pot Men. Bill and Ben was first initiated by Mark Lovick, a producer and director from Sydney, Australia, in the 1990s, with Laurence Harbottle, legal trustee of the Freda Lingstrom Estate, London. However, this arrangement was curtailed, before the copyright expired. The TV series was distributed by BBC Worldwide.

Broadcast
On 4 January 2001, a new series in colour named Bill and Ben began on CBBC on BBC Two, this time involving stop-motion animation, 35mm film style and full colour, and made by Cosgrove Hall Films with a team of ten animators. This show features the voices of John Thomson (who also serves as the narrator), Jimmy Hibbert, and Eve Karpf. The TV series aired in the Republic of Ireland on RTEjr and formerly aired on CBeebies in 2002–2011.

Difference between versions 

Many additions were implemented:
 A mean female rosebush with two talking buds in the neighbour's garden named Rose.
 A mischievous female prickly plant named Thistle.
 A female magpie named Pry, obsessed by shiny treasure, often just every bottle cap.
 A male hedgehog named Boo.
 Slowcoach the Tortoise remains in the series, with few changes to his characteristics. He gets angry at Bill & Ben for ruining his things, but mostly, for messing around.
 A male frog named Tad.
 A female squirrel named Scamper.
 A male baby squirrel named Scuff. He is Scamper's baby nephew.
 A female spider named Whimsy.
 A male earthworm named Whoops.
 A male talking tomato named Ketchup.
 Another male tortoise called Lightning. He is Slowcoach's brother.
 Bill and Ben's voice tones have switched; Bill now has the deep-toned voice, while Ben now has the high-toned voice.
 Weed no longer just says her name; she speaks conventional English, playing an "earth mother" role to Bill and Ben and often assisting them.
 The "man who worked in the garden"

Episodes

Series 1 (2001–2002)

Series 2 (2001–2002)

UK VHS and DVD releases

References

External links
 
 

2000s British children's television series
2002 British television series endings
BBC children's television shows
British preschool education television series
British stop-motion animated television series
British television series revived after cancellation
British television shows featuring puppetry
English-language television shows
Television series by Cosgrove Hall Films